Andrew 'Andy' Collins (born 4 July 1970) is a British television and radio personality.

Career
During the 1990s, Collins presented Game Over, a show on BSkyB's short-lived computer and technology channel .tv. In 1993, he won a Golden Joystick and a date with emcee Monie Love by winning a SNES Cool Spot challenge on Channel 4's GamesMaster.

In 2000, he co-presented "Lost in the Woods" as Novice to the survival Guru John "Brummie" Stokes, a 15 episodes show that aired on Discovery Travel & Living.

From September to December 2002, he presented the British daytime version of Family Fortunes, a show based on the United States TV show Family Feud. In 2005, he appeared on the chat show Heads Up with Richard Herring to discuss his life and career.
He also presents the breakfast show on BBC Three Counties Radio.

He also has been the compere and warm up man for shows such as 
Ant and Dec's Saturday Night Takeaway and the award show on ITV National Television Awards

References

External links
 The Paul O'Grady Show
 Beck Theatre

British game show hosts
1970 births
Living people